Adam Konar (born October 10, 1993) is a Canadian football linebacker for the Edmonton Elks of the Canadian Football League (CFL). He was originally drafted 25th overall in the 2015 CFL Draft by the Edmonton Eskimos and played for four seasons with the team. He played CIS football for the Calgary Dinos.

Early career 
Konar played high school football for the Fighting Irish of Vancouver College as a running back and linebacker. In 2009, Konar suffered a broken fibula and missed post-season games. He was named MVP of the 2010 Subway Bowl with three touchdowns on offence and two interceptions on defence.

In 2011, Konar played college football as a linebacker for the University of British Columbia (UBC) Thunderbirds. He earned the program's rookie of the year award. Due to poor grades, Konar was forced to leave UBC before the 2012 season and take classes at Capilano University. Instead of playing college football in 2012, he joined the Langley Rams of the Canadian Junior Football League. Konar recorded 16 solo tackles, five sacks, three interceptions, and four fumble recoveries in his one season with the Rams, earning himself the B.C. Football Conference's Outstanding Defensive Player award.

While Konar originally intended to return to UBC after a year with the Rams, he instead decided to transfer to the University of Calgary and play for the Calgary Dinos. Konar cited strong academic support as one reason he transferred to Calgary. He missed the entire 2013 season due to a torn ACL injury suffered on the first day of training camp. In 2014, Konar was named a first team All-Canadian after achieving 34 solo tackles, an interception, and a forced fumble. He recorded a team-high eight tackles in the Dinos' playoff loss against the Manitoba Bisons.

Professional career

Edmonton Eskimos 
Konar was listed by the CFL Scouting Bureau as the 16th ranked draft prospect in December 2014, but did not appear on the final rankings. He was invited to the national CFL Combine in early 2015. Konar was selected in the third round of the 2015 CFL Draft by the Edmonton Eskimos with the 25th overall pick. After making the active roster out of training camp, Konar debuted in the season opener against the Toronto Argonauts on June 27, 2015. He would go on to win the Grey Cup with the Eskimos in his rookie season. He played in 34 games with the Eskimos over four years and was released on the eve of 2019 training camp on May 18, 2019.

BC Lions 
Shortly after his release from the Eskimos, Konar signed with his hometown BC Lions on May 20, 2019. He signed a contract extension with the Lions on February 3, 2021.

Edmonton Elks

Konar returned to the Edmonton Elks in free agency on February 8, 2022.

Personal life 
Adam Konar is the son of Kevin Konar, former linebacker and Grey Cup champion for the BC Lions. Konar is also the cousin of Jamie Boreham, a retired CFL kicker.

References

External links
BC Lions bio

1993 births
Living people
BC Lions players
Calgary Dinos football players
Canadian football linebackers
Canadian Junior Football League players
Edmonton Elks players
Players of Canadian football from British Columbia
Canadian football people from Vancouver
UBC Thunderbirds football players